was a Japanese daimyō of the Edo period, who ruled the Karatsu Domain and later the Koga Domain. He was also an official of the Tokugawa shogunate, and held the post of Kyoto Shoshidai. He died in Kyoto while on duty.

References
 https://web.archive.org/web/20071109151422/http://www.city.ibaraki-koga.lg.jp/rekihaku/tenjiannai/josetu/tosikatutokeihu.htm (14 March 2008)
 http://www.asahi-net.or.jp/~me4k-skri/han/kyushu/karatu.html  (14 March 2008)

|-

Daimyo
1722 births
1777 deaths
Kyoto Shoshidai